This is a list of the birds found at Singanallur Lake in Coimbatore in the Indian state of Tamil Nadu. Over 100 species of birds have been spotted in the lake. The list includes the name in Tamil.



Non-passerines

Cormorants
Little cormorant, chinna neer kagam
Indian cormorant, kondai neer kagam
Great cormorant, peria neer kagam

Herons and egrets
Little egret, chinna kokku
Purple heron, sen narai
Grey heron, sambal narai
Great egret, peria kokku
Intermediate egret, naduthara kokku
Cattle egret, unni kokku
Indian pond heron, kuruttu kokku
Black-crowned night heron, erakokku
Western reef egret

Storks

Painted stork, manjal mooku narai
Woolly-necked stork, sengaal narai

Ibis and spoonbill
Glossy ibis, arival mookkan
Black-headed ibis, vellai arival mookkan
Eurasian spoonbill, karandivayan

Kites and harriers
Black kite, kalla parundhu
Brahminy kite, semparundhu
Western marsh harrier, setru poonai parundhu
Pallid harrier, poonai parundhu
Pied harrier, vellai poonai parundhu
Shikra, valluru

Ducks
Gadwall, karuval vathu
Indian spot-billed duck, pulli mookku vathu
Northern shoveler, andi vathu
Garganey, neela chiragi
Common teal, kiluvai

Francolin and fowl
Grey francolin, kowdhari
Indian peafowl, neela mayil

Crakes and rail
White-breasted waterhen, kambul kozhi
Little crake, chinna kaanan kozhi
Ruddy-breasted crake, sivappu kaanaan kozhi
Water cock, thanneer kozhi
Grey-headed swamphen, neela thazhai kozhi
Common moorhen, thaazhai kozhi
Common coot, naamak kozhi

Jacanas
Pheasant-tailed jacana, neela vaal ilai kozhi

Plovers and lapwings
Little ringed plover, pattani uppukkothi
Yellow-wattled lapwing, sivappu mookku aalkatti
Red-wattled lapwing

Godwit, sandpipers and stilt

Black-tailed godwit, karuvaal mukkan
Marsh sandpiper, chinna pachai kaali
Wood sandpiper, pori ullan
Common sandpiper, ullan
Black-winged stilt, nedungaal ullan

Terns
Common tern, aala
Black-bellied tern, karuppu vayitru aala

Doves and pigeons
Blue rock pigeon, mada pura
Little brown dove, chinna thavittu pura
Spotted dove, pulli pura

Parakeet
Rose-ringed parakeet, senthaar pynkili

Cuckoos
Jacobin cuckoo, sudalai kuyil
Asian koel, kokilam
Greater coucal, shenbagam

Owls
Spotted owlet, pulli aandhai

Swifts
Asian palm swift, panai uzhavaran
House swift, nattu uzhavaran

Kingfishers
Small blue kingfisher, siraal meenkothi
Stork-billed kingfisher, peria alagu meenkothi
White-breasted kingfisher, venmaarbu meenkothi
Pied kingfisher, karuppu vellai meenkothi

Bee-eaters
Green bee-eater, pachai panchuruttan
Blue-tailed bee-eater, neelawal panchuruttan
Chestnut-headed bee-eater, chenthalai panchuruttan

Rollers and hoopoe
Indian roller, panangadai
Hoopoe, kondalathi

Barbets
Coppersmith barbet, chemmarbu kukkuruvaan

Woodpeckers
Lesser golden-backed woodpecker, ponmudhugu maram kothi

Other non-passerines

Little grebe, mukkulippan
Spot-billed pelican, kuzhai kada
Darter, pambu thara
Common redshank, pavazha kaali

Passerines

Larks
Indian bushlark, sivappu irakkai vaanambadi
Oriental skylark, chinna vaanambadi

Martin and swallows
Barn swallow, thagaivilaan
Red-rumped swallow, sivappu pitta thagaivilaan

Wagtails and pipit
White wagtail, vellai vaalatti
Large pied wagtail, karuppu vellai vaalatti
yellow wagtail, manjal vaalatti
Grey wagtail, karum saambal vaalatti
Paddyfield pipit, vayal nettai kaali

Shrikes and woodshrikes
Brown shrike, pazhuppu keechaan
Rufous-backed shrike, chemmudhugu keechaan
Common woodshrike, kattu keechaan

Bulbuls
Red-whiskered bulbul, sivappu meesai chinnaan
Red-vented bulbul, chinnaan

Robin and chats
Indian robin, karunchittu
Common stonechat, kalkuruvi
Pied bushchat, karuppu vellai pudhar chittu

Laughingthrushes
Yellow-billed babbler, venthalai silamban

Warblers, prinias and tailorbird
Zitting cisticola, karungottu kadhirkuruvi
Ashy prinia, saambal kadhirkuruvi
Paddyfield warbler, vayal kadhirkuruvi
Blyth's reed warbler, blyth naanal kadhirkuruvi
Clamorous reed warbler, naanal kadhirkuruvi
Common tailorbird, thaiyal chittu
Greenish warbler, pachai kadhirkuruvi
Eastern Orphean warbler, karunthalai kathirkuruvi

Flycatchers
Indian paradise flycatcher, arasawal eppidippan

Flowerpeckers
Tickell's flowerpecker, tickell malar kothi

Sunbirds
Purple-rumped sunbird, oodha pitta thenchittu
Purple sunbird, oodha thenchittu

Munias
White-rumped munia, venmudhugu munia
Spotted munia, pulli chillai
Tricolored munia, karunthalai chillai

Sparrows
House sparrow, chittu

Weavers
Baya weaver, tookanag kuruvi

Starling and myna
Rosy starling, chollakkuruvi
Common myna, naganavaai

Orioles
Indian golden oriole, maangkuil
Black-headed oriole, karunthalai maangkuil

Drongos
Black drongo, karung karichaan

Crows and treepies
Indian treepie, vaal kakkai
House crow, kakkai
Jungle crow, andam kakkai

References
Birds of Singanallur Lake, Coimbatore, Tamil Nadu

Singanallur Lake
Birds, Singanallur Lake
Singanallur Lake, Birds
Birds, Singanallur Lake
Singanallur Lake, Birds